McLean v. Arkansas Board of Education, 529 F. Supp. 1255 (E.D. Ark. 1982), was a 1981 legal case in the US state of Arkansas.

A lawsuit was filed in the United States District Court for the Eastern District of Arkansas by various parents, religious groups and organizations, biologists, and others who argued that the Arkansas state law known as the Balanced Treatment for Creation-Science and Evolution-Science Act (Act 590), which mandated the teaching of "creation science" in Arkansas public schools, was unconstitutional because it violated the Establishment Clause of the First Amendment to the United States Constitution.

Judge William Overton handed down a decision on January 5, 1982, giving a clear, specific definition of science as a basis for ruling that creation science is religion and is simply not science. The ruling was not binding on schools outside the Eastern District of Arkansas but had considerable influence on subsequent rulings on the teaching of creationism.

Arkansas did not appeal the decision and it was not until the 1987 case of Edwards v. Aguillard, which dealt with a similar law passed by the State of Louisiana, that teaching "creation science" was ruled unconstitutional by the Supreme Court, making that determination applicable nationwide.

Act 590 had been put forward by a Christian fundamentalist on the basis of a request from the Greater Little Rock Evangelical Fellowship for the introduction of legislation based on a "model act" prepared using material from the Institute for Creation Research. It was opposed by many religious organizations and other groups.

Parties
The plaintiffs in the suit, who opposed the "balanced treatment" statute, were led by the Reverend William McLean, a United Methodist minister.

The other plaintiffs were:
Bishop Kenneth Hicks, of the Arkansas Conferences of the United Methodist Church;
The Right Reverend Herbert A. Donovan of the Episcopal Diocese of Arkansas;
The Most Reverend Andrew Joseph McDonald, Catholic Bishop of Little Rock;
Bishop Frederick C. James of the African Methodist Episcopal Church or Arkansas;
The Reverend Nathan Porter, individually and as father and next friend of Joel Randolph Porter;
The Reverend George W. Gunn, minister of the Pulaski Heights Presbyterian Church in Little Rock;
Dr. Richard B. Hardie, Jr., minister of the Westover Hills Presbyterian Church in Little Rock;
The Reverend Earl B. Carter, minister of the United Methodist Church, and program director of the North Arkansas Conference of the United Methodist Church;
The Reverend George Panner, minister of the United Methodist Church, and program director of the Little Rock Conference of the United Methodist church;
Dr. John P. Miles, minister of St. James United Methodist Church in Little Rock, and vice-chair of Americans United for Separation of Church and State in Arkansas;
Rev. Jerry Canada, minister of the United Methodist Church, and editor of The Arkansas Methodist;
The American Jewish Congress and American Jewish Committee, two national Jewish organizations;
The Union of American Hebrew Congregations, the national federation of Reform Jews;
Frances C. Roelfs, a biology teacher at Springdale High School in Springdale, Arkansas;
Charles Bowlus, individually and as father and next friend of Cordelia Ann and Christopher Felix;
Lon Schultz, individually and as father and next friend of Andrea Schultz;
The Arkansas Education Association, a teachers' union;
The National Association of Biology Teachers;
E. E. Hudson, Associate Professor of Biological Sciences at Arkansas Technical University;
Mike Wilson, of Jacksonville, Arkansas, an attorney and member of the Arkansas House of Representatives who voted against the act;
National Coalition For Public Education and Religious Liberty (National PEARL).

The defendants were the Arkansas Board of Education and its members, in their official capacity, the director of the Department of Education, in his official capacity, and the State Textbooks and Instructional materials Selecting Committee. The Pulaski County Special School District and its directors and superintendent were named in the original complaint but were voluntarily dismissed by plaintiffs at the pre-trial conference on October 1, 1981.

Background
Various state laws prohibiting teaching of evolution had been introduced in the 1920s. They were challenged in 1968 at Epperson v. Arkansas which ruled that "The law's effort was confined to an attempt to blot out a particular theory because of its supposed conflict with the Biblical account, literally read. Plainly, the law is contrary to the mandate of the First, and in violation of the Fourteenth Amendment to the Constitution." The creationist movement turned to promoting teaching creationism in school science classes as equal to evolutionary theory.

Arkansas Act 590
Arkansas Act 590 of 1981, entitled the "Balanced Treatment for Creation Science and Evolution Science Act," mandated that "creation science" be given equal time in public schools with evolution.

Creation science was defined as follows:
"Creation science means the scientific evidences for creation and inferences from those evidences. Creation science includes the scientific evidences and related inferences that indicate:
Sudden creation of the universe, energy and life from nothing;
The insufficiency of mutation and natural selection in bringing about development of all living kinds from a single organism;
Changes only with fixed limits of originally created kinds of plants and animals;
Separate ancestry for man and apes;
Explanation of the Earth's geology by catastrophism, including the occurrence of worldwide flood;
A relatively recent inception of the Earth and living.

Evolution science was defined as follows:
"Evolution-science" means the scientific evidences for evolution and inferences from those scientific evidences. Evolution-science includes the scientific evidences and related inferences that indicate:
Emergence by naturalistic processes of the universe from disordered matter and emergence of life from nonlife;
The sufficiency of mutation and natural selection in bringing about development of present living kinds from simple earlier kinds;
Emergency [sic] by mutation and natural selection of present living kinds from simple earlier kinds;
Emergence of man from a common ancestor with apes;
Explanation of the Earth's geology and the evolutionary sequence by uniformitarianism; and
An inception several billion years ago of the Earth and somewhat later of life.

The Act was signed into law by Governor Frank D. White on March 19, 1981.

McLean v. Arkansas ruling
Judge William Overton's ruling handed down on January 5, 1982, concluded that "creation-science" as defined in Arkansas Act 590 "is simply not science". The judgment defined the essential characteristics of science as being:
It is guided by natural law;
It has to be explanatory by reference to natural law;
It is testable against the empirical world;
Its conclusions are tentative, i.e. are not necessarily the final word; and
It is falsifiable.

Overton found that "creation science" failed to meet these essential characteristics for these reasons:
Sudden creation "from nothing" is not science because it depends upon a supernatural intervention which is not guided by natural law, is not explanatory by reference to natural law, is not testable and is not falsifiable;
"insufficiency of mutation and natural selection" is an incomplete negative generalization;
"changes only within fixed limits of originally created kinds" fails as there is no scientific definition of "kinds", the assertion appears to be an effort to establish outer limits of changes within species but there is no scientific explanation for these limits which is guided by natural law and the limitations, whatever they are, cannot be explained by natural law;
"separate ancestry of man and apes" is a bald assertion which explains nothing and refers to no scientific fact or theory;
Catastrophism and any kind of Genesis Flood depend upon supernatural intervention, and cannot be explained by natural law;
"Relatively recent inception" has no scientific meaning, is not the product of natural law; not explainable by natural law; nor is it tentative;
No recognized scientific journal has published an article espousing the creation science theory as described in the Act, and though some witnesses suggested that the scientific community was "close-minded" and so had not accepted the arguments, no witness produced a scientific article for which publication has been refused, and suggestions of censorship were not credible;
A scientific theory must be tentative and always subject to revision or abandonment in light of facts that are inconsistent with, or falsify, the theory. A theory that is by its own terms dogmatic, absolutist, and never subject to revision is not a scientific theory;
While anybody is free to approach a scientific inquiry in any fashion they choose, they cannot properly describe the methodology as scientific, if they start with the conclusion and refuse to change it regardless of the evidence developed during the course of the investigation.

The creationists' methods do not take data, weigh it against the opposing scientific data, and thereafter reach the conclusions stated in [the Act] Instead, they take the literal wording of the Book of Genesis and attempt to find scientific support for it. The Act took a two-model approach to teaching identical to the approach put forward by the Institute for Creation Research, which assumes only two explanations for the origins of life and existence of man, plants and animals: it was either the work of a creator or it was not. Creationists take this to mean that all scientific evidence which fails to support the theory of evolution is necessarily scientific evidence in support of creationism. The judgment found this to be simply a contrived dualism which has no scientific factual basis or legitimate educational purpose.

The judge concluded that "the Act was passed with the specific purpose by the General Assembly of advancing religion," and that it violated the First Amendment's Establishment Clause.

The test that Overton developed on the basis of Michael Ruse's testimony was later criticized by the philosopher of science Larry Laudan who argued that rather than call Creation Science "non-science" it would have been more cogent to show that it was "bad science". Chandra Wickramasinghe was the single scientist testifying for the defense of creationism. He hypothesized on panspermia and on "the possibility of high intelligence in the Universe and of many increasing levels of intelligence converging toward a God as an ideal limit."

References

Further reading

External links

 McLean v Arkansas Documentation Project—although much of the transcript of the case was lost, including evidence from Francisco Ayala, this project seeks to preserve and disseminate copies of surviving transcripts.
 Additional Copy of Transcripts—another site providing a copy of the surviving portions of the transcript, including 71 additional pages (Part 1, Part 2) not available on the other site.
 Ten Major Court Cases about Evolution and Creationism
 Encyclopedia of Arkansas History and Culture entry on McLean v. Arkansas Board of Education

Creation science
United States creationism and evolution case law
United States district court cases
1982 in United States case law
1982 in religion
American Civil Liberties Union litigation
1982 in Arkansas
1982 in education
Education in Arkansas